Joseph Dresser Tetley (1825–1878) was a member of the New Zealand Legislative Council from 8 July 1867 to 19 June 1869. His family were from Clervaux, at Croft, in Yorkshire, though he was born a little further south, at Topcliffe.

He became a sheep farmer in Marlborough, on the Kekerengu River, from 1857 or 1858. He also had an interest in Starborough, near Seddon.

He resigned from Parliament in 1869, upon fleeing the country to escape his creditors. One of them blamed another Parliamentarian, Nathaniel Levin, and a well-publicised slander case followed. Tetley may have gone to Paraguay. There was a report that his wife died in Panama and that he returned to England. More probably, he lived at Colonia, in Uruguay, and died there in 1878.

References

External links 
 photo taken about 1860

Members of the New Zealand Legislative Council
1825 births
1878 deaths
People from the Marlborough Region